Jean-François Hernandez (born 23 April 1969) is a French former professional footballer who played as a central defender.

Club career
Born in Tours of Spanish descent, Hernandez played for Toulouse FC, FC Sochaux-Montbéliard and Olympique de Marseille in his own country, amassing Ligue 1 totals of 177 games and three goals in representation of the first two clubs. In the 1995–96 season, he helped the third promote from Ligue 2 as runners-up.

Hernandez moved to Spain in January 1998, where he spent the remainder of his career. He started out at SD Compostela, making his La Liga debut on the 4th by coming on as a 14th-minute substitute in a 1–1 away draw against Real Oviedo; the Galicians went on to suffer relegation.

The following four years, Hernandez alternated between the top flight and the Segunda División, with Rayo Vallecano and Atlético Madrid. He retired in 2002, at the age of 33.

Personal life
Hernandez's sons, Lucas and Theo, are also footballers. The former stated in October 2018 that they had not had contact with Jean-François in 12 years.

In 2022, French newspaper L'Équipe found that Hernandez – who had not been seen in 18 years – was living in Thailand. Close contacts said that he had attempted to restore contact with his sons, but had been blocked legally by their mother.

References

External links

OM Passion profile 

1969 births
Living people
French people of Spanish descent
Sportspeople from Tours, France
French footballers
Footballers from Centre-Val de Loire
Association football defenders
Ligue 1 players
Ligue 2 players
Toulouse FC players
FC Sochaux-Montbéliard players
Olympique de Marseille players
La Liga players
Segunda División players
SD Compostela footballers
Rayo Vallecano players
Atlético Madrid footballers
French expatriate footballers
Expatriate footballers in Spain
French expatriate sportspeople in Spain